Indrė Venskevičiūtė (born 18 December 1991) is a Lithuanian footballer who plays as a goalkeeper for A Lyga club MFA Žalgiris Vilnius. She has been a member of the Lithuania women's national team.

References

1991 births
Living people
Women's association football goalkeepers
Lithuanian women's footballers
Lithuania women's international footballers
Gintra Universitetas players